Arman Nairovich Tsarukyan (born October 11, 1996) is an Armenian-Russian professional mixed martial artist. He currently competes in the Lightweight division in the Ultimate Fighting Championship (UFC). As of January 17, 2023, he is #8 in the UFC lightweight rankings.

Armenian male mixed martial artists

Mixed martial arts career

Early career
Tsarukyan made his professional debut in mixed martial arts on September 25, 2015 against Shamil Olokhanov and won by technical knockout in the first round. He lost his next fight against Alexander Belikh by first-round knockout. Arman continued fighting for mixed martial arts promotions in Russia and Asia, winning his next 12 fights with 9 finishes, including a first round submission victory against Belikh to avenge his first loss. He compiled a 13–1 record prior to signing a four-fight contract with the UFC.

Ultimate Fighting Championship
Tsarukyan made his UFC debut against Islam Makhachev, one of the main training partners of Khabib Nurmagomedov, on April 20, 2019 at UFC Fight Night: Overeem vs. Oleinik. It was a fast-paced fight with high level wrestling exchanges, and Tsarukyan lost the fight via a unanimous decision. This fight earned him the Fight of the Night bonus.

Tsarukyan faced Olivier Aubin-Mercier on 27 July 2019 at UFC 240 and won the fight via unanimous decision.

Tsarukyan was expected to face Davi Ramos on April 11, 2020 at UFC Fight Night: Overeem vs. Harris. Due to the COVID-19 pandemic, the event was eventually postponed. The bout eventually moved to UFC Fight Night 172 on July 19, 2020. He won the fight via unanimous decision.

Tsarukyan was expected to face Nasrat Haqparast on January 24, 2021 at UFC 257. However, on the day of the weigh ins, Haqparast pulled out of the fight citing an illness. As a result, the promotion negotiated a matchup between Tsarukyan and Matt Frevola. Subsequently, Tsarukyan forfeited 20% of his purse as a result of missing weight, which went to Frevola. Tsarukyan won the fight via unanimous decision.

Tsarukyan faced Christos Giagos on September 18, 2021 at UFC Fight Night 192. He won the fight via technical knockout in round one. This win earned him the Performance of the Night award.

Tsarukyan faced Joel Álvarez on February 26, 2022 at UFC Fight Night 202. He won the bout via ground and pound TKO in the second round. The win also earned Tsarukyan his second consecutive Performance of the Night bonus award.

Tsarukyan faced Mateusz Gamrot on June 25, 2022  at UFC on ESPN 38. He lost the closely contested fight via unanimous decision. 15 of 22 MMA media outlets scored the bout in favor of Tsarukyan. Both fighters earned the Fight of the Night award.

Tsarukyan faced Damir Ismagulov on December 17, 2022, at UFC Fight Night 216. He won the fight via unanimous decision.

Tsarukyan is scheduled to face Renato Moicano  on April 29, 2023,  at UFC Fight Night 223.

Championships and accomplishments

Mixed martial arts
Ultimate Fighting Championship
Fight of the Night (Two Times) 
Performance of the Night (Two times)

Mixed martial arts record

|-
|Win
|align=center|19–3
|Damir Ismagulov
|Decision (unanimous)
|UFC Fight Night: Cannonier vs. Strickland
| 
|align=center|3
|align=center|5:00
|Las Vegas, Nevada, United States
|
|-
|Loss
|align=center|18–3 
|Mateusz Gamrot
|Decision (unanimous)
|UFC on ESPN: Tsarukyan vs. Gamrot
|
|align=center|5
|align=center|5:00
|Las Vegas, Nevada, United States
|
|-
|Win
|align=center|18–2
|Joel Álvarez
|TKO (punches)
|UFC Fight Night: Makhachev vs. Green
|
|align=center|2
|align=center|1:57
|Las Vegas, Nevada, United States
|
|-
|Win
|align=center|17–2
|Christos Giagos
|TKO (punches)
|UFC Fight Night: Smith vs. Spann 
|
|align=center|1
|align=center|2:09
|Las Vegas, Nevada, United States
|
|-
| Win
| align=center|16–2
| Matt Frevola
| Decision (unanimous)
| UFC 257 
| 
| align=center|3
| align=center|5:00
| Abu Dhabi, United Arab Emirates
|
|-
| Win
| align=center|15–2
| Davi Ramos
| Decision (unanimous)
| UFC Fight Night: Figueiredo vs. Benavidez 2  
| 
| align=center|3
| align=center|5:00
| Abu Dhabi, United Arab Emirates
|
|-
| Win
| align=center|14–2
| Olivier Aubin-Mercier
| Decision (unanimous)
| UFC 240 
| 
| align=center|3
| align=center|5:00
| Edmonton, Alberta, Canada
|
|-
| Loss
| align=center|13–2
| Islam Makhachev
| Decision (unanimous)
| UFC Fight Night: Overeem vs. Oleinik 
| 
| align=center|3
| align=center|5:00
| Saint Petersburg, Russia
| 
|-
| Win
| align=center|13–1
| Felipe Olivieri
| KO (head kick)
| League S-70: Plotforma S-70 2018
| 
| align=center|3
| align=center|1:25
| Sochi, Russia
|
|-
| Win
| align=center| 12–1
| Júnior Assunção
| Decision (unanimous)
| MFP 220/KLF: Kunlun Fight vs. Modern Fighting Pankration
| 
| align=center| 3
| align=center| 5:00
| Khabarovsk, Russia
| 
|-
| Win
| align=center| 11–1
| Haotian Wu
| TKO (spinning back kick to the body and punches)
| Gods of War World MMA Championship
| 
| align=center| 3
| align=center| 0:31
| Beijing, China
|
|-
| Win
| align=center| 10–1
| Takenori Sato
| Decision (unanimous)
| MFP 214: Governor's Cup 2017
| 
| align=center| 3
| align=center| 5:00
| Khabarovsk, Russia
| 
|-
| Win
| align=center| 9–1
| Kyung Pyo Kim
| Decision (unanimous)
| Road FC 043
| 
| align=center| 3
| align=center| 5:00
| Seoul, South Korea
| 
|-
| Win
| align=center| 8–1
| Márcio Breno
| Submission (rear-naked choke)
| League S-70: Plotforma S-70 2017
| 
| align=center| 1
| align=center| 2:54
| Sochi, Russia
| 
|-
| Win
| align=center| 7–1
| Nizamuddin Ramazanov
| Submission (rear-naked choke)
| MFP 209: Mayor's Cup 2017
| 
| align=center| 1
| align=center| 2:27
| Khabarovsk, Russia
| 
|-
| Win
| align=center| 6–1
| Gustavo Wurlitzer
| Submission (rear-naked choke)
| OFS 11: Octagon Fighting Sensation 11
| 
| align=center| 1
| align=center| 3:22
| Moscow, Russia
| 
|-
| Win
| align=center| 5–1
| Alexander Belikh
| Submission (guillotine choke)
| MFP: Eastern Rubicon 2
| 
| align=center| 1
| align=center| 2:51
| Khabarovsk, Russia
| 
|-
| Win
| align=center| 4–1
| Dmitriy Shkrabiy
| TKO (punches)
| MFP 204: International Pankration Tournament
| 
| align=center| 1
| align=center| 2:21
| Vladivostok, Russia
| 
|-
| Win
| align=center| 3–1
| Alexander Merezhko
| Submission (anaconda choke)
| MFP: Governor's Pankration Cup 2016
| 
| align=center| 2
| align=center| 1:28
| Petropavlovsk-Kamchatsky, Russia
| 
|-
| Win
| align=center| 2–1
| Ali Khaibulaev
| KO (punch)
| MFP: Cup of Administration in Modern Pankration
| 
| align=center| 1
| align=center| 0:33
| Petropavlovsk-Kamchatsky, Russia
| 
|-
| Loss
| align=center| 1–1
| Alexander Belikh
| KO (punch)
| MFP: Eastern Rubicon
| 
| align=center| 1
| align=center| 0:30
| Khabarovsk, Russia
| 
|-
| Win
| align=center| 1–0
| Shamil Olokhanov
| TKO (punches)
| MFP: Assault Nights of Spassk 2015
| 
| align=center| 1
| align=center| 2:47
| Spassk-Dalny, Russia
|

References

External links
 

1996 births
Living people
Russian male mixed martial artists
Lightweight mixed martial artists
Mixed martial artists utilizing freestyle wrestling
Ultimate Fighting Championship male fighters
Russian people of Armenian descent
Georgian people of Armenian descent